Rochdi Achenteh (born 7 March 1988) is a Moroccan international footballer who plays as a left back, most recently for FC Ararat-Armenia.

Club career
Achenteh came through the PSV Eindhoven youth system and later played for FC Eindhoven and PEC Zwolle, before leaving Zwolle for Vitesse in January 2014. In January 2016, Achenteh was snapped up by Willem II.

On 25 June 2019, Ararat-Armenia announced the signing of Achenteh. On 18 July 2020, Achenteh left Ararat-Armenia.

International career
Achenteh made his debut for Morocco in a November 2014 Africa Nations Cup qualification match against Benin.

Honours

Ararat-Armenia
Armenian Premier League (1): 2019–20

References

External links

1988 births
Living people
Dutch sportspeople of Moroccan descent
Footballers from Eindhoven
Association football fullbacks
Dutch footballers
Netherlands youth international footballers
Moroccan footballers
Morocco international footballers
Moroccan expatriate footballers
Eredivisie players
Eerste Divisie players
Armenian Premier League players
FC Eindhoven players
PEC Zwolle players
SBV Vitesse players
Willem II (football club) players
FC Ararat-Armenia players
Expatriate footballers in Armenia